Angiola Minella Molinari (3 February 1920 – 12 March 1988) was an Italian politician. She was elected to the Constituent Assembly in 1946 as one of the first group of women parliamentarians in Italy. She subsequently served for two non-consecutive terms in the Chamber of Deputies and two in the Senate.

Biography
Minella was born in Turin in 1920. When she was 12, her father Mario was murdered by fascists. She attended the Liceo Classico Massimo d'Azeglio, where she was a classmate of Gianni Agnelli, and subsequently began studying literature at university. Following the outbreak of World War II, she trained to be a nurse in the Red Cross and worked in a hospital in Bra. She joined the Italian resistance movement in 1944, initially with the Badogliani and then the Brigate Garibaldi.

Following the war, Minella became active in the Savona branch of the Italian Communist Party, in which she met Piero Molinari, who she went on to marry, contrary to the advice of her mother. She was elected to the municipal council of Savona in the March 1946 local elections and was subsequently a PCI candidate in the June 1946 general elections, in which she was one of 21 women elected to the Constituent Assembly. She was elected to the Chamber of Deputies in 1948 and had a daughter Laura in 1950. After losing her seat in the 1953 elections, she became the Italian representative at the Women's International Democratic Federation in East Berlin, serving as its secretary general from 1955.

Minella returned to Italy in 1957 and was elected back to the Chamber of Deputies in the 1958 elections. She was subsequently elected to the Senate in 1963 and re-elected in 1968, serving until 1972. She died in Turin in 1988.

References

1920 births
Politicians from Turin
Italian nurses
Italian women nurses
Italian Communist Party politicians
Members of the Constituent Assembly of Italy
Members of the Chamber of Deputies (Italy)
Senators of Legislature IV of Italy
Senators of Legislature V of Italy
1988 deaths
People in health professions from Turin
20th-century Italian women politicians
Women members of the Chamber of Deputies (Italy)
Women members of the Senate of the Republic (Italy)